The 2018–19 Oral Roberts Golden Eagles women's basketball team represented Oral Roberts University during the 2018–19 NCAA Division I women's basketball season. The Golden Eagles were led by seventh year head coach Misti Cussen and play their home games at the Mabee Center. They were members of The Summit League. They finished the season 18–13, 10–6 in Summit League play to finish in a tie for third place. They advanced to the semifinals of the Summit League women's tournament where they lost to South Dakota State.

Roster

Schedule

|-
!colspan=9 style=| Exhibition

|-
!colspan=9 style=| Non-conference regular season

|-
!colspan=9 style=| Summit League regular season

|-
!colspan=9 style=| Summit League Women's Tournament

See also
2018–19 Oral Roberts Golden Eagles men's basketball team

References

Oral Roberts Golden Eagles women's basketball seasons
Oral Roberts
Oral
Oral